Åkerlund is a Swedish surname. Notable people with the surname include:

Gunnar Åkerlund (1923–2006), Swedish sprint canoeist
Jonas Åkerlund (born 1965), Swedish film and music video director
Magnus Åkerlund (born 1986), Swedish ice hockey player
Olle Åkerlund (1911–1978), Swedish sailor
Totte Åkerlund (Erik) (1915–2009), Swedish curler

Swedish-language surnames